Leptodactylus fuscus is a species of frog in the family Leptodactylidae. Its local names are rana picuda ("woodcock frog") and rana silbador ("whistling frog").

It is found in Argentina, Bolivia, Brazil, Colombia, French Guiana, Guyana, Panama, Paraguay, Peru, Suriname, Trinidad and Tobago, and Venezuela. Its natural habitats are subtropical or tropical dry forests, subtropical or tropical moist lowland forests, subtropical or tropical moist montane forests, dry savanna, moist savanna, subtropical or tropical dry shrubland, subtropical or tropical moist shrubland, subtropical or tropical dry lowland grassland, subtropical or tropical seasonally wet or flooded lowland grassland, swamps, freshwater lakes, intermittent freshwater marshes, pastureland, plantations, rural gardens, urban areas, heavily degraded former forest, ponds, irrigated land, seasonally flooded agricultural land, and canals and ditches. It is not considered threatened by the IUCN.

References

fuscus
Amphibians of Argentina
Amphibians of Bolivia
Amphibians of Brazil
Amphibians of Colombia
Amphibians of French Guiana
Amphibians of Guyana
Amphibians of Panama
Amphibians of Paraguay
Amphibians of Peru
Amphibians of Suriname
Amphibians of Trinidad and Tobago
Amphibians of Venezuela
Amphibians described in 1799
Taxonomy articles created by Polbot